Akbarpur Senga is a village and Gram panchayat in Bilhaur Tehsil, Kanpur Nagar district, Uttar Pradesh, India. It is located 53 KM away from Kanpur City. It is located near Ganga river.

References

Villages in Kanpur Nagar district